Bat Yam-Komemiyut railway station is a railway station on the Rosh HaAyin–Beersheba line. It is located at the Komemiyut interchange of the Ayalon Highway, on the border between Bat Yam and Holon.

Train service 
All trains serving the Rosh HaAyin–Beersheba line stop at this station, as well as at all stations of the line.

On most weekday hours there is a train every 30 minutes each direction. On rush hours there is a train every 15 minutes each direction. Some of the southbound trains terminate at Rishon LeZion Moshe Dayan or Ashkelon and do not continue to Beersheba.

Public transport connections 
The station is served by bus routes 2A, 6, 11, 14, 19, 26, 40, 85, 87, 99, 143, 240 and 425.

References

External links

Railway stations in Tel Aviv District
Bat Yam
Holon
2011 establishments in Israel
Railway stations opened in 2011